Carl Friedrich Hermann Roesler (18 December 1834 – 2 December 1894) was a German legal scholar, economist, and foreign advisor to the Meiji period Empire of Japan.

Biography

Early life

Life in Japan
In 1878, Roesler was invited by the government of Japan to serve as an advisor on international law to the Foreign Ministry. One compelling reason for his choice to move to Japan was due to his conversion to Roman Catholicism in 1878, Roesler faced dismissal from service in Mecklenburg due to his religion. A timely meeting with Japanese ambassador to Germany, Aoki Shūzō introduced Roesler to a new opportunity, and Roesler became one of several legal experts from Germany and France working on development of the Japanese legal system.

In 1884, Roesler became an adviser to the Japanese Cabinet. As the request of Itō Hirobumi Roesler assisted Inoue Kowashi and took an influential role in the preparation of the draft of the Japanese Commercial Code and the Constitution of the Empire of Japan.

From the time of the Iwakura mission, the Japanese ruling oligarchy had evaluated the various forms of government extant in Europe and America and were most impressed by the Austro-Germano-Prussian model, based on theories by Lorenz von Stein and Rudolf von Gneist and the organization of Prussian government designed by Albert Mosse. Roesler expanded on these theories, by recommending a constitutional monarchy in which the monarch was head of state, but not constrained by the legislature, whose primary responsibility was to provide advice and consent to the Emperor's rule, and not to govern the country or to promulgate laws. Moreover, sovereignty was with the Emperor and not with the people.

Roesler remained in Japan until 1893. While in Japan, relationship with the German legation in Japan and his socialization with the German expatriate community was almost non-existent.

After leaving Japan, Roesler and his family moved to Bolzano, then part of Austria-Hungary where he died shortly after.

Works
 Lehrbuch des Deutschen Verwaltungsrechts (Textbook of Administrative Law). Erlangen: Deichert 1872 f.
 Die deutsche Nation und das Preußenthum (The German Nation and Prussianity). Zürich: Schmidt 1893.

External links
 Article on Roesler in the Allgemeine Deutsche Biographie

References
 Losano, Mario G.:Berichte aus Japan, 1879-1880 (Reports from Japan, 1879-1880. Milano: Ed. Unicopli 1984.
 Rauscher, Anton: Die soziale Rechtsidee und die Überwindung des wirtschaftsliberalen Denkens: Hermann Roesler und sein Beitrag zum Verständnis von Wirtschaft und Gesellschaft (The idea of social law and the overcoming of liberal economic thought. Hermann Roesler und his contribution to the understanding of economy and society). München: Schoeningh 1969.
 Siemes, Johannes: Hermann Roesler und die Einführung des deutschen Staatsrechts in Japan (Hermann Roesler and the introduction of German constitutional law in Japan. Tokyo 1962.
 Hermann Roesler and the making of the Meiji State: an examination of his background and his influence on the founders of modern Japan. Berlin: Duncker & Humblot 1968.
 Suzuki Yasuzô: Hermann Roesler und die japanische Verfassung (Hermann Roesler and the Japanese constitution). Tokyo: Sophia University 1941.

19th-century German people
German economists
Jurists from Bavaria
People of the German Empire
German expatriates in Japan
Foreign advisors to the government in Meiji-period Japan
German expatriates in Austria
People from Lauf an der Pegnitz
1834 births
1894 deaths